Yusuff is a surname. Notable people with the surname include:

 Sodiq Yusuff, Nigerian-American mixed martial artist
 Adeoye Yusuff, English footballer
 Rasheed Yusuff
 M. A. Yusuff Ali
 Salman Yusuff Khan
 Yusuff Syed

See also
 Yussuff
 Yussuf
 Yusuf